Bradley is a district of Huddersfield, West Yorkshire, England, 3 miles north-east of the town centre. It is generally just off the A62 Leeds Road and west of the River Colne and the Huddersfield Broad Canal. Located north of Deighton and east of Brackenhall (via Bradley bar), the area has two primary schools, a secondary school and three churches, (one Catholic, one Protestant and another converted to a gymnasium).

 All Saints' Catholic College, previously All Saints' Catholic High School (which serves the towns of Brighouse and the Huddersfield) is situated in the district. Built in 1960 and formerly two schools, (St Gregory's R.C. Grammar and St. Augustine's R.C. Secondary Modern) the two were combined in 1973 to form the currently large high school.
 Bradley has a council estate with the Keldregate thoroughfare running parallel to Leeds Road (A62), as well as two private developments which effectively constitute villages in themselves.
 It has many Robin Hood references in the area, including 'Sherwood Avenue', 'Huntingdon Avenue' and a former pub site called the 'Little John'.
 The area used to be part of a larger Bradley estate known as 'West Bradley' in comparison to 'East Bradley' which included most of Deighton and a part of Leeds Road.
 Has the Campaign for Real Ale (CAMRA) award-winning White Cross Inn public house on Bradley Road.
 Bradley Park is a 17-acre sports and recreation ground adjacent to Wilton Avenue. In December 2017 ownership of Bradley Park transferred from Kirklees Council to Friends of Bradley Park as part of a community asset transfer. Friends of Bradley Park is a registered charity that was set up for the purpose of owning, running and developing Bradley Park for the benefit of the local community.
 In the area there is also the 18-hole Bradley Park municipal golf course.
 There are 2 pubs in the area, the High Park (on Bradley Road) and the White Cross (at the intersection of Bradley Road and Leeds Road). The Woodman Inn (on Leeds Road) has been demolished as has the Badger (on Bradley Road) and the Little John (on Keldregate).
 Bradley was served by Bradley railway station which was closed in 1952, it was situated on Station Road which joined Leeds Road near the Woodman Inn.
Bradley Viaduct is a 15 arch rail bridge crossing the Huddersfield Broad Canal and River Colne now converted to a cycleway.

The school TV series How We Used To Live used Bradley as the name for a whole town, clearly located in West Yorkshire.

References

Areas of Huddersfield